George Asafo-Adjei (born January 12, 1997) is a former American football offensive tackle. He played college football at Kentucky.

Professional career
Asafo-Adjei was drafted by the New York Giants in the seventh round, 232nd overall, of the 2019 NFL Draft. He was placed on injured reserve on August 31, 2019 with a concussion. He was waived on March 12, 2020 following a failed physical.

References

1997 births
Living people
People from West Chester, Butler County, Ohio
Players of American football from Ohio
Sportspeople from the Cincinnati metropolitan area
American football offensive linemen
American sportspeople of Ghanaian descent
Kentucky Wildcats football players
New York Giants players